Vangueriopsis is a genus of flowering plants in the family Rubiaceae.

Distribution
The genus is found in central and south tropical Africa (D.R.Congo to Tanzania and South Africa).

Taxonomy
It was originally described by Walter Robyns in 1928 and contained 18 species in two subgenera Brachyanthus and Rostranthus. Since then most of the species have been transferred to Vangueriella and currently only four species names remain valid.

Species
 Vangueriopsis lanciflora (Hiern) Robyns
 Vangueriopsis longiflora Verdc.
 Vangueriopsis rubiginosa Robyns
 Vangueriopsis shimbaensis A.P.Davis & Q.Luke

References

External links
 World Checklist of Rubiaceae

 
Rubiaceae genera
Flora of Africa
Taxonomy articles created by Polbot